Benjamin Lister (born 1 January 1996) is a New Zealand cricketer. He made his first-class debut for Auckland in the 2017–18 Plunket Shield season on 7 November 2017. The following week, he took his maiden five-wicket haul in first-class cricket, with figures of five wickets for 29 runs against Northern Districts.

He made his List A debut for Auckland in the 2017–18 Ford Trophy on 3 December 2017. He made his Twenty20 debut for Auckland in the 2017–18 Super Smash on 13 December 2017. In June 2018, he was awarded a contract with Auckland for the 2018–19 season. In September 2018, he was named in the Auckland Aces' squad for the 2018 Abu Dhabi T20 Trophy. On 17 November 2019, in the 2019–20 Ford Trophy, Lister took his first five-wicket haul in List A cricket. He finished as the leading wicket-taker in the tournament, with 23 dismissals in eleven matches.

In June 2020, he was offered a contract by Auckland ahead of the 2020–21 domestic cricket season. In October 2020, in the opening round of the 2020–21 Plunket Shield season, Lister became the first COVID-19 replacement in a cricket match. Lister replaced Mark Chapman, who reported feeling unwell, inline with the updated International Cricket Council (ICC) playing conditions for a substitute due to COVID.

International career
In January 2023, Lister earned his maiden call-up to the New Zealand cricket team for their T20I series against India. On 1 February 2023, he made his T20I debut for New Zealand against India at Narendra Modi Stadium, Ahmedabad.

In March 2023, he was named in New Zealand's One Day International (ODI) squad for their series against Sri Lanka.

References

External links
 

1996 births
Living people
New Zealand cricketers
Place of birth missing (living people)
Auckland cricketers